The University of Chicago Laboratory Schools (also known as Lab or Lab Schools and abbreviated as UCLS though the high school is nicknamed U-High) is a private, co-educational day Pre-K and K-12 school in Chicago, Illinois. It is affiliated with the University of Chicago. Almost half of the students have a parent who is on the faculty or staff of the university.

History 
The Laboratory Schools were founded by American educator John Dewey in 1896 in the Hyde Park neighborhood of Chicago. Calvin Brainerd Cady was director of the music department under Dewey. The school began as a progressive educational institution that goes from nursery school through 12th grade.

The school was an attempt to create a unified school system from the kindergarten to university. Managed by the university's Department of Philosophy, Psychology, and Education, it served as a laboratory to test hypotheses and build on the knowledge about education because John Dewey, who became head of the department in 1894, wanted to test certain ideas of his.

Dewey acknowledges in his book How We Think (1910) the contribution made by his wife Alice Dewey to the development of the school in its early years, through whose involvement his ideas "attained such concreteness as comes from embodiment and testing in practice".

Campus 
The Laboratory Schools consists of two interrelated campuses. The Historic Campus, located at 1362 East 59th Street, fills two full city blocks. It houses grades 3–12 (about 1,200 students) in five connected buildings: Blaine Hall (built in 1903), Belfield Towers (1904), Judd Hall (1931), the high school (built in 1960), the middle school (1993), and Gordon Parks Arts Hall (2015) which has 100 classrooms. Two connected gymnasiums also sit on this campus, Sunny Gym (built in 1929) and Kovler Gymnasium (built in 2000) and students have access to both Scammon Garden and Jackman Field. Kovler Gymnasium contains two basketball courts, named "Upper" and "Lower" Kovler gyms.

The Laboratory schools are renowned around Hyde Park and Chicago for their exemplification of Modern Gothic style architecture.

In September 2013, Lab opened Earl Shapiro Hall on its new Early Childhood Campus located at 5800 S. Stony Island Avenue. This new building, designed by Valerio Dewalt Train and FGM Architects, is home to approximately 625 children in nursery through second grade. The building is named for Earl Shapiro, who graduated from Lab in 1956.

In 2018, artificial turf was installed on Jackman Field, and a jogging track and improved lighting were added. In 2019, Lab renovated a number of its athletic facilities including its natatorium and locker rooms.

Student body and academics 

The school has over 2,160 students in total from Pre-Kindergarten – Grade 12.

Today the school is divided into a Nursery School (Pre-K and Kindergarten), Primary School (grades 1 and 2), Lower School (grades 3 through 5), Middle School (grades 6 through 8), and High School  (grades 9 through 12). Many children begin in nursery school and continue through their high school graduation, and 75% of applications are for nursery school or 9th grade. The student/teacher ratio is 8:1.

According to the 2021 Lab Student Wellness Survey, 48% of girls and 25% of boys, for a total of 37% of students, identify as part of the LGBTQ community.

The high school was ranked fourth in the nation for its record of sending graduates to elite universities and colleges. From 2012 to 2016, some of the colleges at which U-High students matriculated were: University of Chicago (71 students), New York University (20 students), Northwestern University (19 students), Yale University (15 students), Stanford University (11 students), Massachusetts Institute of Technology (9 students), Brown University (9 students), Johns Hopkins University (9 students), Princeton University (7 students), Columbia University (7 students), and Harvard University (3 students). For the class of 2018, forty-nine percent of Lab students attended top-25 institutions across the country.

U-High offers more than 150 different classes. All are college preparatory in nature and there are more than 30 Advanced Placement or Advanced Topic courses. High school students may also qualify to take classes at the University of Chicago at no extra charge, and about 20 do so each year. The average composite ACT score is 31.5. The school maintains four separate libraries which collectively hold over 110,000 volumes.

Extracurricular activities 
High school students may choose from 40+ different clubs and activities. The high school math, science, and Model UN teams are regular contenders for – and winners of – state titles. The school's newspaper/website, The U-High Midway, and the yearbook, U-Highlights, regularly win state and national awards, as does its arts magazine, Renaissance. Other popular activities include theater, identity and affinity clubs, Student Council, policy debate, and Model UN. The Model UN team is consistently ranked among the top in the nation, and is world-renowned for its competitive excellence. In 2011, it was ranked the #2 High School Model UN team in the United States. In 2018, Lab's Model UN team won the Best Large Delegation award at the Harvard Model UN conference. In addition, the Debate Team has won numerous national circuit tournaments. Furthermore, U-High's Math and Science teams consistently win and place at Regional and State competitions, respectively. Lab also has an award-winning FIRST Robotics Competition team, which has completed internationally, two award-winning FIRST Tech Challenge teams which have competed nationally, and multiple award-winning FIRST LEGO League teams.

Organized by the Office of Alumni Relations Development, members of the student body at U-High are nominated by faculty to serve in the Maroon Key Society. The Maroon Key Society serve as ambassadors for the school, and they help provide tours to visiting alumni, potential students, and other guests to the school.

The high school's extracurricular activities occasionally make national and international news. For example, in 1990 then-Governor Thompson declared a "Matthew Headrick Day" and the US House made a proclamation when then-student Headrick appeared on talk shows including Today after winning the Westinghouse. In response to the award, the Chicago Tribune wrote: "this ... is a ... school where being on the math team ... can actually enhance one's social status." The Tribune's coverage was controversial because, as noted previously, U-High's extracurricular activities, including the math team, operate on a "no cut policy," and therefore participation was unlikely to confer social status. The faculty responded by posting a banner that humorously read: "The Few. The Proud. The U-High Math Team. Conferring social status since 1990."

The Finance Club was founded in 2015 with more than $100,000 of donated funds to invest.

Notable alumni and people 
The Laboratory Schools have been home to many famous individuals, including the Obama family.

Athletics 
The University of Chicago Laboratory Schools offers a number of different athletic programs for both boys and girls, divided into three categories for Fall (cross country, golf, sailing, boys soccer, girls swimming/diving, girls tennis, and volleyball), Winter (basketball, dance troupe, fencing, squash, boys swimming/diving, and indoor track) and Spring (baseball, fencing, sailing, girls soccer, boys tennis, and track and field). The lower and primary school operates under a strict resistance training regimen to develop the strength required to do these activities early. Freshman, sophomore, and junior varsity squads at U-High operate with a "no cut policy," meaning any student who wishes to participate on that level may, and nearly 65% of U-Highers participate on at least one team. The school's athletic teams, the Maroons, compete in the Independent School League (ISL) and are members of the Illinois High School Association (IHSA).

The 2019 boys soccer team won the IHSA 1A state championship.

The 2019 girls tennis team won the IHSA 1A state championship, becoming the first U-High girls team to win a state championship. The 2021 girls tennis team was also 1A state champion.

The boys basketball team, under ISL Coach of the Year Andre Battle, were 2022 IHSA Regional Champions.

Notable teachers 

Here are a few of the teachers who have worked at Lab:

 Eight Lab teachers have received Chicago's prestigious Golden Apple Award—more than from any other school in the city. (2009 Christina Hayward; 2007 David Derbes; 2004 Rosa McCullagh; 1994 Michael (Spike) Wilson; 1992 Jan Yourist; 1989 Catharine Bell; 1987 Hanna Goldschmidt; 1986 Randy Fowler.) Others have received the Kohl McCormick Early Childhood Teaching Award.
 Mima Maxey (1885–1965) and Marjorie Fay (1893–1977) taught Latin at Lab in the 1930s, following a "credo" that emphasised extended reading of "easy and repetitious" material, without teaching of formal grammar. They wrote A New Latin Primer (1933) based on this approach, along with supplementary Latin reading texts Cornelia (Maxey, 1933) and Carolus et Maria (Fay, 1933). Their work received interest initially, but this declined by the 1940s. Evan Dutmer argues that their teaching approach was "virtually without precedent in American Latin education" and anticipated the theory of comprehensible input as used later in language education.
 A MacArthur “genius” award and the Erikson Institute Award for Service to Children are among the achievements of author/teacher Vivian Paley, who spent most of her career at Lab. (Lessons from her acclaimed book You Can’t Say You Can’t Play shape Lab's approach.)
 Created and funded in honor of Zena Sutherland (a former U. of C. faculty member and still considered among the world's most influential scholars of young people's literature), the annual Sutherland Award for Excellence in Children's Literature is one of the only student-selected book awards in the United States.
 Lab teachers contributed to the University of Chicago School Mathematics Project, the largest university-based mathematics curriculum project in the country. Their results included the nationally acclaimed Everyday Mathematics texts for elementary school students and Transition Mathematics, a middle school pre-algebra text.
 Blue Balliett, author of Chasing Vermeer, The Wright Three, and The Calder Game, based her children's mysteries on her experiences teaching students at Lab.

References 

 Knoll, M. (2014) Laboratory School, University of Chicago. In D. C. Phillips (ed) Encyclopaedia of Educational Theory and Philosophy, Vol. 2 (London: Sage), pp. 455–458.
University of Chicago's Facilities Service Website

External links

100 Years of Learning at The University of Chicago Laboratory Schools
Guide to the University of Chicago Laboratory Schools Records 1891-1986 at the University of Chicago Special Collections Research Center
Guide to the University of Chicago Laboratory Schools Work Reports 1898-1934 at the University of Chicago Special Collections Research Center

Laboratory Schools
Private middle schools in Chicago
Private elementary schools in Chicago
Gifted education
Laboratory schools in the United States
University-affiliated schools in the United States
Private high schools in Chicago
Hyde Park, Chicago